Karen Attard (born 1958) is an Australian writer of fantasy and short fiction.

Biography
Attard's first work to be published was in 1975 with a poem published by Meuse Press, entitled Like an Omen. In 1995 she published a poetry collection published by Five Islands Press entitled Whisper Dark and a short story, Harvest Bay which was featured in the Eidolon (Australian magazine) magazine. Harvest Bay won the 1995 Aurealis Award for best fantasy short story. In 1997 she released two more short stories which were both featured in the Eidolon magazine.

Bibliography

Collections
Whisper Dark (1995)

Poems
Like an Omen (1975)

Short stories
"Harvest Bay" (1995) in  Eidolon (Australian magazine), Spring 1995
"A Momentary Brightness" (1997) in Eidolon, issue 24, Autumn 1997
"Extracts from a Chronicle" (1997) in Eidolon, Issue 25/26, Spring 1997

References

Australian women poets
Living people
1958 births
Australian women short story writers
Australian fantasy writers
20th-century Australian women writers
Women science fiction and fantasy writers
20th-century Australian short story writers